Don Currie (born 7 July 1934) is a New Zealand cricketer. He played in eleven first-class matches for Canterbury and Central Districts from 1959 to 1963.

References

External links
 

1934 births
Living people
New Zealand cricketers
Canterbury cricketers
Central Districts cricketers
Cricketers from Christchurch